The light-winged lesser house bat (Scotoecus albofuscus) is a species of vesper bat. It can be found in Benin, Democratic Republic of the Congo, Ivory Coast, Gambia, Ghana, Kenya, Malawi, Mozambique, Nigeria, Senegal, Sierra Leone, South Africa, South Sudan, Tanzania, and Uganda. It is found in dry savanna.

Sources

Scotoecus
Taxa named by Oldfield Thomas
Bats of Africa
Mammals described in 1890
Taxonomy articles created by Polbot